Nahum ben Joseph Samuel Sokolow ( Nachum ben Yosef Shmuel Soqolov, ; 10 January 1859 – 17 May 1936) was a Zionist leader, author, translator, and a pioneer of Hebrew journalism.

Biography
Nahum Sokolow was born in Wyszogród, in the Płock Governorate of Congress Poland in the Russian Empire. He began to attend heder at the age of three. When he was five, his parents moved to Płock. At the age of ten,  he was already renowned as a Hebrew scholar. His father wanted him to study for the rabbinate but with the intervention of Baron Wrangel, the governor of Płock, he enrolled in a secular school. He married at eighteen and settled in Makov, where his father-in-law lived, and earned a living as a wool merchant. At the age of 20, he moved to Warsaw and became a regular contributor to the Hebrew daily HaTzefirah.  Eventually he wrote his own column and went on to become editor and co-owner.  In 1914, after the outbreak of World War I, he moved to London to work with Chaim Weizmann.

Sokolow died in London in 1936.

Literary career
Sokolow was a prolific author and translator. His works include a three-volume history of Baruch Spinoza and his times, and various other biographies. He was the first to translate Theodor Herzl's novel Altneuland into Hebrew, giving it the name Tel Aviv (literally, "An Ancient Hill of Spring"). In 1909, the name was adopted for the first modern Hebrew-speaking city.

Zionist activism

In 1931, Sokolow was elected President of the World Zionist Congress and served in that capacity until 1935, when he was succeeded by Chaim Weizmann. Sokolow also served as President of the Jewish Agency for Palestine (now called the Jewish Agency for Israel) between 1931 and 1933, when he was succeeded by Arthur Ruppin.
In 1906, Sokolow was asked to become the secretary general of the World Zionist Congress. In the ensuing years, he crisscrossed Europe and North America to promote the Zionist cause. After moving to London, he was a leading advocate for the Balfour Declaration in which the British government declared its support for a Jewish homeland in Palestine.

On 6 February 1917, a meeting was held in Maida Vale with Weizmann to discuss the results of the Picot convention in Paris. Sokolow and Weizmann pressed on after they had seized leadership from Gaster; they were granted official recognition from the British government.
Historian Martin Kramer argues that securing the assent of Britain's French and American Allies and of the Vatican, which controlled many Christian Holy Sites in the Land of Israel, was a necessary precondition for the Balfour Declaration. Sokolow secured the support of Pope Benedict XV on 4 May 1917, who described the return of the Jews to Palestine as "providential; God has willed it".
Sokolow secured the assent of France in the Cambon letter of 4 June 1917, signed by Jules Cambon, the head of the political section of the French foreign ministry.

Chaim Weizmann wrote to the Manchester Zionist, Harry Sacher, who became a focus for the view that Sokolow and Weizmann had capitulated and forfeited the right to lead by "preferring British Imperialism... to Zionism". Sokolow acted as Weizmann's eyes and ears in Paris on a diplomatic mission with Sir Mark Sykes to negotiate with the French.  The idea that the Jews would form a new kind of Triple Entente under the Ottoman Empire was unsettling to them. No, the delegation left for Paris on 31 March 1917. One purpose of the Entente was to strengthen the hand of Zionism in the US. "The Jews represented a powerful political and economic force... if subterranean influence". Sokolow did not know of the Sykes-Picot Agreement and British-French understanding on Middle Eastern policy matters. He believed that he must report to Weizmann that what France really meant by a "Greater Syria", taking the whole of Palestine for themselves. In a series of letters in April and May 1917, Weizmann accused Sokolow of letting the Zionists down in negotiations with France. Sokolow countered by replying that he remained totally committed to a British Palestine.

The desiderata or things desired by the Jews for their new homeland were "facilities of colonization, communal autonomy, rights of language and establishment of a Jewish chartered company." Sokolow's eventual diplomacy triumph for Zionism in Paris made them "accept in principle the recognition of Jewish nationality in the capacity of National Home, local autonomy etc. It is beyond my boldest expectations", he wrote. They expected a quid pro quo for support against Germany, which was further made urgent by the entry of the US on 6 April 1917 to the global conflict. They now associated an Allied victory with securing "Zionist aspirations", a phrase also used by Sykes in his despatches to Balfour.
On 9 April, the Paris conference ended, marking a high point in Sokolow's career. The Zionists were now open to all diplomatic rounds. Sokolov came to Rome to gain support for the plan of a Jewish state in Palestine and spoke to Monsignor Eugenio Pacelli, the future Pope Pius XII. That Pope Benedict XV had vehemently condemned anti-Semitism a year earlier was seen as a good omen.

In Rome, the Vatican City were considering accepting terms. Sokolow's letters asked advice from Weizmann;  the amazed Sokolow met the Pope on 6 May. The Zionists began to feel more confident about their patriotism.  Sokolow asked for "moral support", a philosophical equality, and immediately wrote Weizmann about the "expressing of favour", but Weizmann was not so emotional since he had a tough hard-headed businesslike character. He congratulated Sokolow on the success.  Sokolow was called upon to stop at Paris by Jules Cambon and Prime Minister Alexandre Ribot. They were still concerned that Zionism would cause unlimited damage to world security if unleashed in Bolshevik Russia.

Published works
 Hatzofe levayt yisrael

Awards and recognition
Kibbutz Sde Nahum is named for him.

See also
Sokolov Award

References

Bibliography

Books

Articles

External links 

 The personal papers of Nahum Sokolow are kept at the Central Zionist Archives in Jerusalem
 Sokolow, Nahum b. Joseph Samuel in the Jewish Encyclopedia
Sokolow's memorial address on the 25th anniversary of Herzl's death
 

1859 births
1936 deaths
People from Płock County
People from Płock Governorate
Polish Jews
Jews from the Russian Empire
Emigrants from the Russian Empire to the United Kingdom
British people of Polish-Jewish descent
Zionist activists
Modern Hebrew writers
British Jewish writers
Polish male writers
Polish journalists
Journalists from the Russian Empire
Male writers from the Russian Empire
Jewish activists
Polish translators
British translators
Jewish Agency for Israel
Burials at Mount Herzl